This is a list of series released by or aired on TVB Jade Channel in 1998.

First line series
These dramas aired in Hong Kong from 7:35pm to 8:35pm, Monday to Friday on TVB.

Second line series
These dramas aired in Hong Kong from 9:35pm to 10:35pm, Monday to Friday on TVB.

Third line series
These dramas aired in Hong Kong from 10:35pm to 11:05pm, Monday to Friday on TVB.

Other series

External links
  TVB.com

TVB dramas
1998 in Hong Kong television